Phorbol 12,13-dibutyrate (PDBu) is a phorbol ester which is one of the constituents of croton oil.  As an activator of protein kinase C, it is a weak tumor promoter compared to 12-O-tetradecanoylphorbol-13-acetate.

PDBu is widely used as a chemical reagent because of its solubility in water and other organic solvents.

References

Butyrate esters
Diterpenes
Alcohols
Ketones
Carcinogens
Cyclopentenes
Phorbol esters